The House at 309 Waltham Street in Newton, Massachusetts, is a well-preserved high style Greek Revival house.  The -story house was built c. 1835; it has a classic Greek temple front, with two-story Ionic columns supporting an entablature and pedimented gable, with a balcony at the second level.  Single-story Ionic columns support a porch running along the left side of the house.  It is one six documented temple-front houses in the city.

The house was listed on the National Register of Historic Places in 1986.

See also
 National Register of Historic Places listings in Newton, Massachusetts

References

Houses on the National Register of Historic Places in Newton, Massachusetts
Houses completed in 1835
Greek Revival architecture in Massachusetts